The Superjomi Tojikiston (Tajiki: Суперҷоми Тоҷикистон), or Tajik Super Cup, is a one-match football annual competition. The two participating clubs are holders of the Tajik League champions title and the Tajik Cup. If the Tajik League championship and the Tajik Cup are won by the same team, then the other participant is the runner-up of Tajik League. The match is played at the beginning of the season, typically in March.

Matches

Statistics by team

See also
USSR Super Cup

References

 
Football competitions in Tajikistan
Tajikistan
Recurring sporting events established in 2010